Frank Garcia (May 8, 1927 – July 15, 1993) was a magician and professional gambler. He was known as "The Man With The Million Dollar Hands." His specialty was gambling scams and cheating.

Biography
The son of Spanish immigrants, he decided to become a magician after seeing a performance of David "Fu Manchu" Bamberg.

As "The Gambling Investigator" he demonstrated and exposed cheating methods at trade shows and to law enforcement organizations throughout the United States and on television shows. Frank Garcia wrote and lectured about the subject throughout his life.

Garcia made "close-up" work his domain. His repertory of card manipulations, sponge-ball magic, cups and balls, and sleight-of-hand was highly regarded by his peers.

Frank was a frequent guest on TV talk shows including The Dick Cavett Show, and David Suskind, sometimes performing magic and sometimes revealing the scams of crooked gamblers such as three card monte players on the streets of New York.

Published works 
In the course of his life, Garcia wrote 22 books, covering topics such as card cheating,  gambling, and especially close-up card magic.  Some of his magic books are considered collectors items.
His most notable books are:
 Encyclopedia of Sponge Ball Magic (1976)
 Million Dollar Card Secrets (1972)
 Super Subtle Card Miracles (1973)
 Exclusive Card Secrets (1980)
 Exclusive Card Miracles (1980)
 The Close Up Card Magic of Frank Garcia, Part I (1982)
 The Close Up Card Magic of Frank Garcia, Part II (1982)
 Marked Cards And Loaded Dice (1962) which was later released as How To Detect Crooked Gambling (1977)
 All In A Nutshell (1974)
 Don't Bet On It! (1978)
 Magic With Cards (1974)  (co-authored with George Schindler)
 Amedeo's Continental Magic  (co-authored with George Schindler)

Death
Frank Garcia died at age 66 from natural causes at his home in Manhattan on July 15, 1993. He is survived by his wife, Betty Moss, and a son Frank.

References

External links 
Frank Garcia MagicPedia entry
Frank Garcia performing the Three Shell game
Who's who in magic history

American magicians
1927 births
1993 deaths
Sleight of hand
Card magic
People from Manhattan
American people of Spanish descent
Magic consultants